Ralph Wedgwood may refer to:

Ralph Wedgwood (inventor) (1766–1837), English inventor
Sir Ralph Wedgwood, 1st Baronet (1874–1956), British businessman
Sir Ralph Wedgwood, 4th Baronet (born 1964), British philosopher